Jabal Umm ad Dami, in historic Wadi Rum, is the highest mountain in Jordan. Its claimed elevation of 1,854 metres is consistent with SRTM data.

See also 

 List of elevation extremes by country

References

Umm Ad Dami
Highest points of countries